was the sixty-seventh of the sixty-nine stations of the Nakasendō highway connecting Edo with Kyoto in Edo period Japan. It was located in the present-day city of Moriyama, Shiga Prefecture, Japan.

History
Moriyama-juku was one of the original staging points on the ancient Tōsandō highway connecting the capital of Heian-kyō with the provinces of eastern Japan from the end of the Nara period onwards. Its name means "protecting mountain", and refers to Mount Hiei which contains the temple of Enryaku-ji, the head temple of the Tendai sect.  At its height, Enryaku-ji was a huge complex with over 3,000 temples and a strong army of warrior-monks. Its head abbot was usually an Imperial prince, and the temple was a powerful political force, often intervening in the politics of the court. The temple was largely destroyed by Oda Nobunaga in 1580, but was gradually rebuilt under Toyotomi Hideyoshi and the Tokugawa shogunate.  

In the early Edo period, the system of post stations on the Nakasendō was formalized by the Tokugawa shogunate in 1602. Moriyama-juku was a popular stopping point for pilgrims on their way to the temple from the east. It was also on the sankin-kōtai route by the Kishū Tokugawa clan and other western daimyō to-and-from the Shogun's court in Edo. 

Moriyama-juku is 502 kilometers from Edo and was often the first stop on the route for travelers departing Kyoto. Many travelers preferred Moriyama-juku over Kusatsu-juku, which tended to be much more crowded as it was on a juncture of the Nakasendō with the Tōkaidō.

Between Moriyama-juku and neighboring Musa-juku was the starting point for  a branch route which ran close to the shore of Lake Biwa, bypassing the next three stations of the Nakasendō to rejoin the main route at Toriimoto-juku. It was so-named because it was the designated route for use by Korean envoys during the Joseon missions to Japan.

During the Bakumatsu period, Princess Kazu-no-miya stayed at Moriyama-juku on her way to marry Shogun Tokugawa Iemochi in Edo.

Modern Moriyama-juku
Moriyama-juku forms the "old town" of modern Moriyama city, and still retains several old buildings; however the honjin was demolished in 2004. One of the surviving buildings is the Uno house, formerly a  sake brewery operating from the end of the Edo period to the beginning of the Meiji era. It is also the house where former Prime Minister Sosuke Uno was born and raised.

Moriyama-juku in The Sixty-nine Stations of the Kiso Kaidō
Utagawa Hiroshige's ukiyo-e print of Moriyama-juku dates from 1835 -1838. The print depicts a placid scene in the post station with several open-fronted buildings facing the Yasugawa River. Mount Mikami is shown in the background, as the setting in spring, with many sakura trees in full bloom. Each building has a different style of roof. On the right, a waitress tries to entice travelers into a tea house, but a peddler, man on  a packhorse, and porters with a kago (palanquin) pass by. The middle tea house appears marginally more successful, as one person is seated on the verandah.

Neighboring post towns
Nakasendō
Musa-juku - Moriyama-juku - Kusatsu-juku

References

External links

Hiroshige Kiso-Kaido series
Moriyama on Kiso Kaido Road
Shiga-Biwako Visitors Guide

Notes

Stations of the Nakasendō
Stations of the Nakasendō in Shiga Prefecture
Ōmi Province
Moriyama, Shiga